Hans Walitza (born 26 November 1945) is a retired German football striker and manager.

Career

Statistics

1 1966–67, 1969–70 and 1970–71 include the Regionalliga promotion playoffs. 1975–76 and 1977–78 include the 2. Bundesliga/Bundesliga promotion/relegation playoffs.

References

External links
 

1945 births
Living people
Sportspeople from Mülheim
German footballers
Bundesliga players
2. Bundesliga players
VfL Bochum players
1. FC Nürnberg players
Association football forwards
Footballers from North Rhine-Westphalia
West German footballers